Bethune College is a women's college located on Bidhan Sarani in Kolkata, India, and affiliated to the University of Calcutta. It is the oldest women's college in India. It was established as a girls' school in 1849, and as a college in 1879.

History

The college was founded as the Calcutta Female School in 1849 by John Elliot Drinkwater Bethune, with the financial support of Dakshinaranjan Mukherjee. The school started in Mukherjee's home in Baitakkhana, with 21 girls enrolled. The following year, enrolment rose to 80. In November, on a plot on the west side of Cornwallis Square, the cornerstone for a permanent school building was laid. The name "Hindu Female School" was inscribed on the copper-plate placed in the stone and on the ceremonial silver trowel made for the occasion. Support for the school waned after Bethune's death in August 1851.

The government took it over in 1856, renaming it Bethune School after its founder in 1862–63. In 1879 it was developed into Bethune College, the first women's college in India and Bethune school was Second (First being in Bhidewada Pune, by Jyotirao Phule) women's school in whole Asia.

Rankings

Bethune College has ranked 77th among colleges in India by the National Institutional Ranking Framework (NIRF) in 2021.

Notable alumnae
Kadambini Ganguly (1861–1923), one of the first two female graduates of the British Empire
Chandramukhi Basu (1860–1944), one of the first two female graduates of the British Empire
Abala Bose (1864–1951), social worker
Sarala Devi Chaudhurani (1872–1945), promoter of female education
Anwara Bahar Chowdhury (1919–1987), social activist and writer
Kamala Das Gupta (1907–2000), freedom fighter nationalist
Amalprava Das, social worker
Bina Das (1911–1986), revolutionary and nationalist
Tista Das (born 1978), transsexual actress
Kalpana Datta (1913–1995), independence activist
Mira Datta Gupta (1907–1983), freedom fighter and activist
Swarnakumari Devi (1855–1932), poet, novelist and social worker
Begum Khaleda Zia, first female Prime Minister of Bangladesh 
Ashoka Gupta (1912–2008), freedom fighter and social worker
Neena Gupta, (b. 1984) mathematician, who has provided a solution to the Zariski Cancellation Problem
Aditi Lahiri (born 1952), academic linguist
Abha Maiti (born 1925), politician
Kanak Mukherjee (1921–1995), political activist
Khanto Bala Rai (born 1897), teacher, school head in Midnapore
Shukhalata Rao(1886–1969), social worker and children's author
Kamini Roy (1864–1933), poet, social worker and feminist
Leela Roy (1900–1970), politician and reformer
Shobha Sen, actress
Amiya Tagore (1901–1988), singer
Pritilata Waddedar (1911–1932), revolutionary nationalist

See also

References

Further reading

External links

 Official website

Academic institutions associated with the Bengal Renaissance
Universities and colleges in Kolkata
Schools in Colonial India
Women's universities and colleges in West Bengal
University of Calcutta affiliates
Educational institutions established in 1849
1849 establishments in British India